The 2007 FIBa EuroCup Final Four was the concluding tournament of the 2006–07 FIBA EuroCup. Akasvayu Girona won its first title, after beating Azovmash 79–72 in the Final.

Bracket

Final standings

Final four
FIBA EuroChallenge Final Fours
2006–07 in Spanish basketball
2006–07 in Ukrainian basketball
2006–07 in Italian basketball
International basketball competitions hosted by Spain
International basketball competitions hosted by Catalonia